Catarina Rodrigues (born 3 January 1973) is a Portuguese judoka.

She was awarded the Olympic Medal Nobre Guedes in 2001.

Achievements

References
 

1973 births
Living people
Portuguese female judoka
20th-century Portuguese women
21st-century Portuguese women